Roy Chaderton Matos (born August 17, 1942) is a Venezuelan politician, lawyer, and diplomat. A graduate of the Universidad Central de Venezuela, Chaderton is one of the most experienced members of the Venezuelan diplomatic corps. He was foreign minister from May 2002 to July 2004 in the government of Hugo Chávez.

Early life and family 
Chaderton is the son of Roy Chaderton Farrier, who worked in an oil company, and Elena Matos Arreaza.

Diplomatic career 

Chaderton is a senior member of the Venezuelan Diplomatic Service. He served in Poland, Germany, Belgium and the Permanent Mission of Venezuela to the United Nations. He was Ambassador to Gabon from 1985 to 1987; Ambassador to Norway from 1987 to 1990; Director General of International Policy from 1990 to 1993; Ambassador to Canada from 1993 to 1994; Vice Minister of Foreign Relations from 1994 to 1995; Ambassador to the United Kingdom from 1996 to 2000; Ambassador to Colombia from 2001 to 2002; Minister of Foreign Relations from 2002 to 2004; Ambassador to France from 2004 to 2007; Ambassador to Mexico and Ambassador Permanent Representative to the Organization of American States (OAS) from 2008 to 2015.

He was the Director-General of the Pedro Gual Diplomatic Institute at the Venezuelan Foreign Ministry, previously he was chancellery coordinator, deputy at the Latin American Parliament in Panama, Venezuelan Ambassador empowered to pursue peace talks with the Government of Colombia and FARC in Cuba and In-charge of International Affairs of the PSUV . Currently he is accredited to Switzerland as Ambassador Extraordinary and Plenipotentiary of the Bolivarian Republic of Venezuela since 4 April 2022. .

Sanctions

In 2015, the group Venezuelans Persecuted in Exile (Veppex) in Miami asked the Secretary General of the Organization of American States José Miguel Insulza to sanction Roy Chaderton, then ambassador to the organization, for a controversial statement made during an interview on the program  of the state-owned Venezolana de Televisión. Veppex highlighted in a statement that the description made by the ambassador was "a comparison that incites violence". Chaderton apologized for his comment saying that his statements were taken out of context, and that what he was trying to warn was that in the face of an "invasion by the United States" there would be no distinction between Chavistas and opponents.

Canada sanctioned 40 Venezuelan officials, including Chaderton, in September 2017. The sanctions were for behaviors that undermined democracy after at least 125 people were killed in the 2017 Venezuelan protests and "in response to the government of Venezuela's deepening descent into dictatorship"; Chrystia Freeland, Foreign Minister said, "Canada will not stand by silently as the government of Venezuela robs its people of their fundamental democratic rights". The Canadian regulations of the Special Economic Measures Act prohibited any "person in Canada and any Canadian outside Canada from: dealing in property, wherever situated, that is owned, held or controlled by listed persons or a person acting on behalf of a listed person; entering into or facilitating any transaction related to a dealing prohibited by these Regulations; providing any financial or related services in respect of a dealing prohibited by these Regulations; making available any goods, wherever situated, to a listed person or a person acting on behalf of a listed person; and providing any financial or other related services to or for the benefit of a listed person."

Honours

  Order of the Liberator, First Class
  Order of Francisco de Miranda, First Class
  Order of May, Grand Coss
  Order of St. Olav, Grand Cross
  Order of Bernardo O'Higgins
  Order of San Carlos, Grand Cross
  National Order of Merit (France), Grand Officer
  Order of the Southern Cross, Grand Cross
  Order of the Sun of Peru, Grand Cross
 Order of the Madara Horseman, Bulgaria
 Order Doctor César Naranjo Ostty, Venezuela
 Admiral Luis Brion Naval Medal, Venezuela

See also
List of Ministers of Foreign Affairs of Venezuela

References

External links
 Roy Chaderton Matos's address to the 63rd session of the United Nations General Assembly, as Chairman of the delegation of Venezuela, September 29, 2008

 

  

1942 births
Living people
Venezuelan Ministers of Foreign Affairs
Permanent Representatives of Venezuela to the Organization of American States
Central University of Venezuela alumni
Ambassadors of Venezuela to France
Ambassadors of Venezuela to Mexico
Ambassadors of Venezuela to Gabon
Ambassadors of Venezuela to Norway
Ambassadors of Venezuela to Canada
Ambassadors of Venezuela to the United Kingdom
Ambassadors of Venezuela to Colombia
Venezuelan people of British descent
Venezuelan diplomats